The WIC Farmers’ Market Nutrition Act of 1992 (P.L. 102-314) established a program authorizing projects that provide participants in the Special Supplemental Nutrition Program for Women, Infants, and Children (WIC) with food coupons that can be used to purchase fresh, unprocessed foods, such as fruits and vegetables at farmers’ markets.

References 

United States federal welfare and public assistance legislation
1992 in law
1992 establishments in the United States